John Hewson (1744 – 1821) was a textile artist. He trained in a cotton-printing factory in London, but moved to the United States on the advice of his friend Benjamin Franklin, and set up a calico printing factory in the Kensington neighborhood of Philadelphia, Pennsylvania. His chintzes were used in American quilts, often as the centerpiece. In November 2014, a DNA test revealed Hewson to be the paternal fifth great-grandfather of American actress and comedian Tina Fey.

He is interred at Palmer Cemetery in Philadelphia.

References

John Hewson in Remembering Kensington & Fishtown: Philadelphia's Riverward Neighborhoods, by  By Kenneth W. Milano, 2008 

1744 births
1821 deaths
Burials in Pennsylvania
Textile artists
Businesspeople from London
18th-century American artists
18th-century American male artists
19th-century American artists
18th-century textile artists
19th-century textile artists